Cairnie Burn is a stream that rises in the Mounth, or eastern range of the Grampian Mountains, north of Netherley, Aberdeenshire, Scotland.  Cairnie Burn is a generally northeast flowing watercourse that is a tributary to the Crynoch Burn.  Cairnie Burn rises in the eastern part of the Durris Forest, east of the Elsick Mounth passage.

History
Roman legions marched from Raedykes to Normandykes Roman Camp crossing Cairnie Burn in the Durris Forest as they sought higher ground evading the bogs of Red Moss and other low-lying mosses associated with the Burn of Muchalls. That march used the Elsick Mounth, one of the ancient trackways crossing the Mounth of the Grampian Mountains, lying west of Netherley.

In poetry
An 1890 poem entitled The Auld House O' Gask by Caroline Oliphant took note of Cairnie Burn: "that winds around the flowery bank of bonnie Cairnie Burn".

See also
Muchalls Castle

References

Rivers of Aberdeenshire